The discography of the Scottish alternative rock band Kid Canaveral consists of three studio albums, fourteen singles, and one extended play (EP).

Studio albums

Singles

Extended plays

Compilations

Limbo Live Volume 01 (limited CD and digital download, 23 April 2009. MGM-001) - contains a live version of the track "Second Time Around". Recorded live at The Voodoo Rooms, Edinburgh, Scotland on 13 December 2008
The Inside Track (digital download, 4 August 2010) - charity album for Waverley Care featuring "Stretching the Line"

Other

Good Morning (free Christmas digital download, 24 Dec 2009. STV-006)

References

Discographies of British artists
Alternative rock discographies